Marc Sabat (born 22 September 1965) is a Canadian composer based in Berlin, Germany, since 1999.

Works
He has made concert music pieces, works with video, and installations with acoustic instruments and, in some recent pieces, computer-generated electronics, drawing inspiration from investigations of the sounding and perception of small number relations (Just Intonation), American folk and experimental musics, Minimal Art. His work is presented internationally in radio broadcasts and at festivals of new music including the Bludenzer Tage zeitgemäßer Musik, Donaueschinger Musiktage, MaerzMusik, Darmstadt and Carnegie Hall. His works do not fall into a single personal style, but they generally share a crystalline clarity of texture and a seek to focus listeners' perception of sounding structures into a process of musical 'thinking'. Sabat is a frequent collaborator, having worked often with visual artists and other composers, including brother painter and filmmaker Peter Sabat. Other collaborators include John Oswald (composer), Martin Arnold, Nicolas Fernandez, Matteo Fargion, Wolfgang von Schweinitz, Stefan Bartling, and Düsseldorf-based artist Lorenzo Pompa. Sabat's music may be heard on the Plainsound Music Edition YouTube Channel.

Research
Since the early 1990s, Sabat has been reinvestigating harmony by studying the theory and musical applications of Just Intonation. Together with Wolfgang von Schweinitz he conceived and developed a method of staff notation for JI ratios called The Extended Helmholtz-Ellis JI Pitch Notation. He has also studied JI intervals empirically on string and brass instruments, developing a list of so-called "tuneable intervals": ratios within a three-octave span which can readily be tuned by ear using electronic or acoustic sounds. These intervals appear frequently in Sabat's compositions and also are the basis of a self-tuning computer algorithm ("Micromaelodeon") which is currently under development. The HEJI notation was updated and slightly revised in 2020, in collaboration with Thomas Nicholson with contributions from Wolfgang von Schweinitz, Catherine Lamb and M.O. Abbott.

Recent projects
Recent projects include works for orchestra, chamber orchestra, and various ensembles. Sabat is one of few composers composing for larger forces with the sounds of extended just intonation.

Studies, teaching, residencies
Largely self-taught as a composer, Sabat studied violin at the University of Toronto, at the Juilliard School in New York, as well as working privately with improviser Malcolm Goldstein and composers James Tenney and Walter Zimmermann, among others. He attended courses in electronic and computer music at McGill University. In 2008-9 he took part in a postgraduate pilot project initiated by the Berlin University of the Arts, the Graduiertenschule für die Künste und die Wissenschaften.

He teaches courses in composition, acoustics and experimental intonation at the Universität der Künste Berlin, and has been a guest artist at the California Institute of the Arts, at the Liszt Academy Budapest, the Escola Superior in Barcelona, the Janáček Music Academy in Brno and the Paris Conservatoire. He has been a regular lector at the Ostrava Days Festival and Institute since 2017.

In fall 2010, he was artist-in-residence of the Villa Aurora in Los Angeles, followed in 2011 by a one-year Stipendium at the German Academy in Rome, Villa Massimo. Previous residencies include Akademie Schloss Solitude (1997–98, music juror: Christian Wolff), Herrenhaus Edenkoben (1996, music juror: Peter Eötvös).

Career as violinist
Beginning in the 1980s, Sabat has also been active as a performer on violin and adapted viola, concentrating primarily on American Experimental Music of the 20th Century, including his own work. He has recorded CDs of music by James Tenney, Morton Feldman, Christian Wolff, and Maria de Alvear, amongst others. In the 1990s, whilst living in Toronto, he formed a duo with pianist Stephen Clarke, as well as performing with the Modern Quartet and Arraymusic. In recent years Sabat for the most part has concentrated on creating and playing his own music. Together with colleagues Catherine Lamb and Rebecca Lane he is a founding member of the collective Harmonic Space Orchestra.

List of works

source:
 Official Worklist

References

External links
 Plainsound Music Edition

1965 births
20th-century classical composers
21st-century classical composers
Experimental composers
Microtonal composers
Just intonation composers
Just tuning and intervals
Canadian classical composers
Canadian installation artists
Canadian video artists
Canadian sound artists
Living people
Artists from Ontario
Musicians from Kitchener, Ontario
Canadian expatriates in Germany
Canadian male classical composers
20th-century Canadian composers
Pupils of James Tenney
20th-century Canadian male musicians
21st-century Canadian male musicians